Krasnoturyinsk is a town in Sverdlovsk Oblast, Russia, located on the Turya River (Ob's basin),  north of Yekaterinburg. Population:

History
It was one of the copper mining settlements established in 1758 on the Turya River. At the time, it was known as Turyinskiye Rudniki. Later it was known as Turyinsky. It was granted town status and renamed Krasnoturyinsky in 1944..  It is also known for its representation as the landing place of Rocky Balboa in Rocky IV when he travels to Russia.

Administrative and municipal status
Within the framework of the administrative divisions, it is, together with five rural localities, incorporated as the Town of Krasnoturyinsk—an administrative unit with the status equal to that of the districts. As a municipal division, the Town of Krasnoturyinsk is incorporated as Krasnoturyinsk Urban Okrug.

Sports
The bandy club Dynamo Mayak has played in the highest division of the Russian Bandy League and now plays in the second highest division, Russian Bandy Supreme League. Their home arena has a capacity of 5000. The city is now interested in making it equipped with artificial ice. In 2017 Yevgeny Ivanushkin, originally from Krasnoturinsk, became the second player, after Sergey Lomanov Jr., to score 1 000 goals in Russian Bandy Super League.

References

Notes

Sources

 
Cities and towns in Sverdlovsk Oblast
Verkhotursky Uyezd
Monotowns in Russia